Campylomma verbasci, the mullein bug, is a species of plant bug in the family Miridae. It is found in Europe and Northern Asia (excluding China) and North America.

References

 Thomas J. Henry, Richard C. Froeschner. (1988). Catalog of the Heteroptera, True Bugs of Canada and the Continental United States. Brill Academic Publishers.

Further reading

 

Phylinae
Insects described in 1843